The Inner Me is the fifth studio album by Taiwanese singer and songwriter Lala Hsu, released by AsiaMuse on 27 December 2017.

At the 29th Golden Melody Awards, The Inner Me was nominated in five categories and eventually won Best Album in Mandarin and Best Female Vocalist — Mandarin for Hsu.

Track listing

Music videos

Awards and nominations

References

External links
  Asiamuse - 心裡學

2017 albums
Lala Hsu albums